The Treaties of Bautzen and Merseburg may refer to

The Peace of Bautzen of 1018, which ended the German-Polish War (1002–1018)
The Treaty of Merseburg of 1033, an agreement between Mieszko II of Poland and the Holy Roman Emperor Conrad II
An armistice of 1813, made during the War of the Sixth Coalition between Napoleon and Russia and Prussia